The 4th Louis Vuitton Cup was held in San Diego, United States in 1995. The winner, Team New Zealand, went on to challenge for and win the 1995 America's Cup.

The teams
Originally ten challengers from seven nations submitted bids to compete for the 1995 Louis Vuitton Cup. However Il Moro di Venezia collapsed after the death of its director Raul Gardini. The Challenger of Record Committee then eliminated a Russian bid after it missed several deadlines and the French challenge representing Yacht Club d'Antibes withdrew even though its yacht Harmony was almost completed.

Team New Zealand
Team New Zealand represented the Royal New Zealand Yacht Squadron and was headed by Peter Blake. The skipper was Russell Coutts and the crew included Brad Butterworth, Tom Schnackenberg, Murray Jones, Tony Rae, Kevin Shoebridge and Craig Monk.

The team was the second challenge from the Royal New Zealand Yacht Squadron but built on the work of three previous challengers since 1987. Co-designed by Doug Peterson and Laurie Davidson, their boat showed a significant jump forward in speed. In sea trials against New Zealand's 1992 entry, NZL-20, a very good boat at the 1992 Cup, the new black boat easily outpaced it. Recalled boat Doug Peterson, "That first day Brad Butterworth came back and said, 'My god, it's like a different class of boat.' " The team finished with an official record of 41–2 and led 93% of the 260 legs it competed in.

One Australia

One Australia was skippered by John Bertrand, the winner of the 1983 America's Cup. The syndicate won the 1994 IACC World Championship with AUS-31. AUS-35 was then constructed through a partnership agreement with the Australian Challenge – a deal that, it was claimed, violated the two boats per syndicate rule. However the boat was allowed to compete in the 1995 Louis Vuitton Cup. She performed well until halfway through its match race of 5 March 1995, when it suddenly broke in half in heavy seas and sank within two minutes. She was the first America's Cup contender ever (144 years) to lose a match race by shipwreck. The crew survived, and reverted to their second boat, AUS-31 for the rest of the regatta. They still made the Louis Vuitton Cup final, where they lost to Team New Zealand 5–1.

The crew included Adam Beashel, navigator Andrew Cape, Iain Murray, Matt Mitchell, Billy Bates, Mark Richards, Alan Smith, Don McCracken and Rod Davis. The backup helmsman was David Barnes

Sydney 95
The Syd Fischer challenge from Sydney, this was Fischer's fourth America's Cup entrant. The team made frequent changes to its afterguard during the Cup and finished with a 5-19 record, finishing last on points. The crew included Chris Law and mainsail trimmer and tactician Neal McDonald.

Spanish Challenge
Copa America '95 Desafio Español was the last team to arrive in San Diego. The team was restrained financially and could not build on the 1992 campaign. The team only had one boat, ESP-42, and finished with a 3–21 record.

France America 95
From Yacht Club de Sete and skippered by Marc Pajot, France America '95 failed to live up to expectations in 1995. France 2 (FRA-33) was damaged while it was being launched in December 1994 and then the keel fell off in February while it was testing a new sail. France 3 (FRA-37) was then demasted in the last round robin. The crew included Bertrand Pacé, Jan Dekker, Yann Gouniot, Christian Karcher and Bernard Labro, and Harold Cudmore was an advisor.

Nippon Challenge
Nippon Challenge built on the 1992 campaign to enter two teams in the 1994 IACC World Championships and have a strong team in the 1995 Cup. Nippon had a 9–9 record sailing with JPN-30 before finishing the round robin in JPN-41 with a 2–4 record. Nippon Challenge then went 0–11 in the Semi finals to finish with an 11–24 overall record. The helmsman was John Cutler and the crew included Peter Evans, Chris Mason and Guy Barron.

Tag Heuer Challenge
Tutukaka Challenge was run on a shoe string budget that saw the team nearly not make it to San Diego until the intervention of Tag Heuer. The team was led by Chris Dickson and the crew included Peter Lester, Mike Sanderson, Kelvin Harrap, Gavin Brady, Grant Loretz, Chris Salthouse, Brad Webb, and Denis Kendall. The team finished with a 24–12 record, making the semi-finals.

Round robin
Four round robin series (RR1-RR4) were held. During Round Robin 1 a team scored 1 point per win, during RR2 a team scored 2 points per win, during RR3 a team scored 4 points per win and during RR4 a team scored 5 points per win.

*One Australia's boat AUS-35 sunk when racing Team New Zealand during RR4 and they were left with only AUS-31.

Finals

Semi finals

Final

References

External links
1995 America's Cup ultimatesail.com

Louis Vuitton Cup
Louis Vuitton Cup
Sports competitions in San Diego
1995 in American sports
1995 America's Cup
International America's Cup Class